Bezdědovice is a municipality and village in Strakonice District in the South Bohemian Region of the Czech Republic. It has about 400 inhabitants.

Administrative parts
Villages of Dobšice and Paštiky are administrative parts of Bezdědovice.

References

Villages in Strakonice District